Thomas McIlworth (17201769?) was a colonial American portraitist, mainly active in the area around Schenectady, New York.

McIlworth was born in Scotland around 1720; his father was the painter Andrew McIlwraith, and his mother Anne was the daughter of portraitist .  Just when he emigrated is unknown; he is known to have been in New York City by 1757, and advertising his work (as "Andrew McElworth") in local papers by 1758.  Five years after moving to New York, he left in search of more commissions, settling in Schenectady and painting a number of prominent locals, as well as residents of Albany.  He married Anna Statia (or Anastasia) Willet of New Jersey in October, 1760; the pair are believed to have lived in Westchester County for some while, and had a number of children before her death in 1766.

McIlworth is said to have been appointed the first Schenectady town clerk in 1765, and is thought to have left the city two years later.  He is last recorded in Montreal in 1767, and is believed to have died around 1769, still in Canada.

McIlworth's influence has been discerned in the work of another colonial New York painter, John Mare, but the nature of their relationship is unknown.

References

External links
Biography at the New York State Museum site

1720s births
1760s deaths
18th-century Scottish painters
British emigrants to the Thirteen Colonies
British male painters
British portrait painters
People of the Province of New York